Colin Robertson (July 27, 1783 – February 4, 1842) was an early Canadian fur trader and political figure.

History 
He was born in Perth, Scotland in 1783. He originally apprenticed in Scotland as a hand weaver but later travelled to New York City where he found work in a grocery store. By 1803, he had joined the North West Company, leaving it in 1809. Robertson then travelled to England, where he became a merchant at Liverpool. In 1814, he returned to Canada in the employ of the Hudson's Bay Company, leading an expedition reestablish the company in the area around Lake Athabasca. Robertson stopped in Manitoba to rebuild Fort Douglas, which had been burnt down by the North West Company. In the meantime, John Clarke continued on to the Athabaska region with the remainder of the expedition but was eventually taken prisoner by the North West Company.

Unable to come to an agreement with Robert Semple, the new governor of Assiniboia, Robertson travelled to York Factory, Manitoba, intending to return to England. After stopping in Montreal to clear his name of charges brought forward by the North West Company, he led a new expedition west. He was taken prisoner by Samuel Black of the North West Company but escaped, fled to the United States and returned to England. In the meantime, Lord Selkirk, who had been guaranteeing Robertson's business debts, had died and Robertson was forced to flee to France. He later returned to Lower Canada.

In 1821, the Hudson's Bay Company and North West Company were united and Robertson became a chief factor in the new company. Now that the two companies were no longer competing, however, men of action were valued less by the company than persons with administrative skills. After falling out of favour with the company's governor, George Simpson, he planned to retire but suffered a paralyzing stroke in 1832. He eventually retired in 1840 and was elected to the Legislative Assembly of the Province of Canada for Two Mountains in the following year.

Robertson died in Montreal in 1842 after an accident where he was thrown from his sleigh.

Legacy 
Mount Robson, on the border between British Columbia and Alberta, is likely named for him,

References

External links 
 

Colin Robertson's Correspondence Book, September 1817-September 1822. E. E. Rich, ed. Toronto: Champlain Society Publications, 1939

1783 births
1842 deaths
Canadian fur traders
Members of the Legislative Assembly of the Province of Canada from Canada East
People from Perth, Scotland
Scottish emigrants to pre-Confederation Quebec
Hudson's Bay Company people
Immigrants to Lower Canada
British expatriates in the United States